The term Chinese Riviera is used for several premier tourist destinations in China:

 Coastal areas in the city of Zhuhai, Guangdong Province.
 The south-eastern coast of Hainan, from Haitang Bay in Sanya to Xiangshuiwan (Perfume Bay) in Lingshui Li.

References 

Geography of Guangdong
Geography of Hainan
Zhuhai